Lomamyia longicollis is a species of beaded lacewing in the family Berothidae. It is found in North America.

References

Further reading

 
 
 
 

Hemerobiiformia